The 1947 NAIA National Tournament was held in March at Municipal Auditorium in Kansas City, Missouri. The 10th annual men's basketball tournament of what is now the National Association of Intercollegiate Athletics (NAIA) featured 32 teams playing in a single-elimination format.

It would be the first time since 1945 the NAIA Semifinalist would feature four new teams. Becoming the 3rd tournament to do so, and a feat that would not be repeated until 1965.

The championship game featured Marshall defeating Mankato State, 73–59. The third place game featured Arizona State-Flagstaff, now Northern Arizona, defeating Emporia State, 47–38.

1947 kicked off the "golden age" of NAIA National Tournaments. Harold Haskins became the first of 16 all-time leading scorers. 
Coach John Wooden withdrew Indiana State from the tournament because the NAIB would not allow black student-athlete Clarence Walker to play. The NAIB changed in time for Walker to play for Indiana in the 1948 tournament.

Awards and honors
Many of the records set by the 1947 tournament have been broken, and many of the awards were established much later:
Leading scorer est. 1963
Leading rebounder est. 1963
Charles Stevenson Hustle Award est. 1958
Coach of the Year est. 1954
Player of the Year est. 1994
Top single-game scoring performances: 2nd by Nate DeLong, Wisconsin-River Falls vs. Marshall (W.Va.). Delong scored 22 field goals had 12 free throws totaling 56 points.
All-time scoring leader; first appearance: Harold Haskins, 12th, Hamline (Minn.) (1947,48,49,50), 14 games, 104 field goals, 72 free throws, 280 total points, 20.0 average per game.

Bracket

  * denotes overtime.

See also
 1947 NCAA basketball tournament
 1947 National Invitation Tournament

References

NAIA Men's Basketball Championship
Tournament
1947 in sports in Missouri